Jamal Dajani is a Palestinian-American journalist and an award-winning producer. He is the co-founder of Arab Talk Radio. He formerly served as Director of Strategic Communications & Media for former Palestinian Prime Minister Rami Hamdallah. Prior to this he was Vice President of Middle East and North Africa at Internews. He is currently a lecturer at San Francisco State University.

Biography

Born in Jerusalem to a prominent Palestinian family that served as custodians of King David’s mausoleum in Mount Zion, Dajani completed his early studies at Collège des Frères and attended Columbia University in New York City, where he received a B.A. in Political Science.

Dajani is former Vice President of Middle East and North Africa at Internews, an international non-profit organization whose mission is to empower local media worldwide to give people the news and information they need, the ability to connect and the means to make their voices heard. Prior to this, he was the Vice President of International News at Link TV and co-creator and series producer of Mosaic: World News from the Middle East, winner of a Peabody Award. In 2006, Dajani launched the Mosaic Intelligence Report, a weekly video analysis broadcast on Link TV and distributed online. He has also worked as producer and in an editorial capacity on several television productions, including Occupied Minds (a documentary about the Palestinian-Israeli conflict), Who Speaks for Islam?, and PBS Frontline World War of Ideas, where he acted .
as a consultant. Dajani has made guest appearances on numerous television and radio networks, and is a contributor to the Listening Post on Al Jazeera English. He has published several articles on the Middle East and blogs regularly on The Huffington Post. He is the co-host of Arab Talk on KPOO radio.

Dajani was appointed by then-Mayor Gavin Newsom to the San Francisco Immigrant Rights Commission where he served as Chair (2005–2009), and served  on the San Francisco Human Rights Commission (2009–2011).  He served for two years (2003–2004) as President of the  Arab Cultural and Community Center of San Francisco, and served on the board of New America Media, a collaboration of ethnic news organizations in the U.S.

Awards

 64th Annual Peabody Award for excellence in radio and television broadcasting – Producer, Mosaic
 10th Annual Webby Awards Honoree – Producer, Mosaic
 ACCC- Community Service Award – 2005
 New California Media "Pathbreaker" Special Achievement Award – 2003
 City & County of San Francisco – Certificate of Honor – 2010
 San Francisco Immigrant Rights Commission – Certificate of Honor – 2009
 State of Californian Senate – Certificate of Recognition – 2009

See also

 Occupied Minds, a 2006 documentary film about the Palestinian - Israeli conflict

References

External links
Jamal Dajani Home Page

American male journalists
Columbia College (New York) alumni
Palestinian film directors
People from Jerusalem
Living people
Palestinian emigrants to the United States
1957 births